Events in the year 2009 in Lithuania.

Events

May 

 May - Lithuania in the Eurovision Song Contest 2009
 17 May - Dalia Grybauskaitė is elected as President of Lithuania in the 2009 Lithuanian presidential election.

June 

 7 June - 2009 European Parliament election in Lithuania.

October 

 5 October - Kaunas shooting

Sports 

 2009 European Athletics U23 Championships
 2009 IIHF World Championship Division I
 Lithuania at the 2009 World Aquatics Championships
 2009 Lithuanian Athletics Championships
 2009 European Wrestling Championships
 Lithuania at the 2009 World Championships in Athletics
 2009 A Lyga
 2009–10 Baltic League
 2008–09 Lithuanian Football Cup
 2009–10 Lithuanian Football Cup
 2010 FIFA World Cup qualification – UEFA Group 7

References 

 
2009 in Europe